Christina Nilsson may refer to:

 Christina Nilsson, (1843 – 1921), Swedish operatic soprano
 Christina Nilsson (shipwreck), schooner that sank in Lake Michigan in 1884
 Christina Nilsson (politician) (born 1956), Swedish politician